City Center Bellevue is a  tall, 27-story high-rise office building in Bellevue, Washington, completed in 1986. It was the tallest building in Bellevue until 2005.

City Center Plaza, also in downtown Bellevue, is a separate 26 story building completed a decade later.

References

External links

City Center Bellevue at Pacific Northwest Architecture 

 

 
 

Skyscrapers in Bellevue, Washington
Skyscraper office buildings in Washington (state)

Office buildings completed in 1986